The Joseph Olpin House at 510 Locust Ave. in Pleasant Grove, Utah, United States, was built in 1874 or 1875, by Joseph Olpin, a skilled mason.  It has also been known as the Edward L. Platt Residence.  It was listed on the National Register of Historic Places in 1977.

It is a two-story rectangular building built of stone with a brick one-and-a-half story rear addition.  Its symmetrical front is three bays wide, and has wooden lintels above its six-over-six windows.  It has two gable end chimneys.  The one-and-a-half-story brick addition is of broken saltbox form, with brick laid in stretcher bond.  The addition's rear door and window bays have segmented arches.

References

Houses completed in 1875
Houses in Utah County, Utah
Saltbox architecture in Utah
Houses on the National Register of Historic Places in Utah
National Register of Historic Places in Utah County, Utah
Buildings and structures in Pleasant Grove, Utah